Issa Kaboré (born 12 May 2001) is a Burkinabé professional footballer who plays as a right-back for Ligue 1 club Marseille, on loan from Premier League club Manchester City, and the Burkina Faso national team.

Club career
On 28 August 2019, Kaboré signed a professional contract with Belgian Side of KV Mechelen. Kaboré signed for English club Manchester City on 29 July 2020, remaining at Mechelen on loan for the forthcoming season.

In July 2021, he joined Troyes on loan for the 2021–22 season. In August 2022, he joined Marseille on loan for the 2022–23 season. On 29 October 2022, he scored his first Ligue 1 goal in a 2–2 away draw against Strasbourg.

International career
Kaboré made his debut for the Burkina Faso national team in a 0–0 friendly tie with the DR Congo on 9 June 2019.

He has been named the Best Young Player of the tournament at the 2021 Africa Cup of Nations held in Cameroon from January to February 2022. Although he did not score a goal in the tournament, Kabore played a key role in Burkina Faso's run to the last-four stage with his attacking and defensive contributions. He made three assists as his side reached the semi-final where they lost 3–1 to eventual winners Senegal.

Honours
Individual
Africa Cup of Nations Best Young Player: 2021

References

External links
 
 

2001 births
Living people
People from Bobo-Dioulasso
Burkinabé footballers
2021 Africa Cup of Nations players
Burkina Faso international footballers
Association football fullbacks
Belgian Pro League players
Ligue 1 players
Manchester City F.C. players
K.V. Mechelen players
ES Troyes AC players
Olympique de Marseille players
Burkinabé expatriate footballers
Burkinabé expatriate sportspeople in England
Burkinabé expatriate sportspeople in Belgium
Burkinabé expatriate sportspeople in France
Expatriate footballers in England
Expatriate footballers in Belgium
Expatriate footballers in France
21st-century Burkinabé people